John Pierce Chase (June 12, 1906 – April 1, 1994) was an American ice hockey player and coach who competed in the 1932 Winter Olympics.

Early life 
Chase grew up in Massachusetts where he excelled in ice hockey and baseball at Harvard University. 
He was the 1932 Harvard University Man at the Plate (baseball). He played three seasons for Harvard's baseball team (1926–1928) while simultaneously serving as the team captain for the Harvard hockey team.

Career 
Chase was highly sought by National Hockey League teams but chose to pursue a career in business instead. He did continue to play amateur hockey, however. In 1932 he was a member of the American ice hockey team, which won the silver medal. He played all six matches and scored four goals.

He was inducted into the United States Hockey Hall of Fame in 1973.

Head coaching record

References

External links
 
 United States Hockey Hall of Fame bio

1906 births
1994 deaths
American men's ice hockey centers
Harvard Crimson baseball players
Harvard Crimson men's ice hockey coaches
Harvard Crimson men's ice hockey players
Ice hockey players from Massachusetts
Ice hockey players at the 1932 Winter Olympics
Medalists at the 1932 Winter Olympics
Olympic silver medalists for the United States in ice hockey
People from Milton, Massachusetts
United States Hockey Hall of Fame inductees
Sportspeople from Norfolk County, Massachusetts